State Route 172 (SR 172) is a  long state highway serving rural Douglas County in the U.S. state of Washington. The highway travels north from U.S. Route 2 (US 2) near Waterville through Withrow and east through Mansfield before ending at SR 17 at Sims Corner. The highway follows the route of a county road built in the 1930s and signed as Secondary State Highway 10B (SSH 10B) in 1955. SSH 10B became SR 172 during the 1964 highway renumbering and served a daily average of less than 700 vehicles in 2011.

Route description

SR 172 begins as Road C NW at an intersection with US 2 at the unincorporated community of Farmer, between Waterville and Coulee City. The highway travels north through farmland and serves Withrow before climbing Lone Butte and turning east into 14th Road NW. SR 172 continues east into Mansfield, where it becomes Main Street and turns southeast into Downtown at Mansfield High School. The roadway turns northeast onto Railroad Avenue, serving the Mansfield Airport. SR 172 leaves Mansfield and continues east as 14th Road NE until it ends at SR 17 at Sims Corner, between Coulee City and Leahy.

Every year the Washington State Department of Transportation (WSDOT) conducts a series of surveys on its highways in the state to measure traffic volume. This is expressed in terms of average annual daily traffic (AADT), which is a measure of traffic volume for any average day of the year. In 2011, WSDOT calculated that between 200 and 690 vehicles per day used the highway, mostly in Mansfield.

History

A gravel county road extending from Lone Butte through Mansfield to Sims Corner first appeared in a 1933 Department of Highways map of Washington. The road was paved and used temporarily by Primary State Highway 10 (PSH 10) until a Bridgeport–Leahy road was built to the northeast in the 1950s. A paved road from Mansfield to Withrow and Farmer was built by 1950 and was signed as an extension of Secondary State Highway 10B (SSH 10B) in 1955. SSH 11B was split into SR 172 and SR 174 in the 1964 highway renumbering.

Major intersections

References

External links

Highways of Washington State

172
Transportation in Douglas County, Washington